Lebaan Bridge or Batang Lebaan Bridge is a major bridge connecting Sibu and Tanjung Manis in Sarawak, Malaysia. Once completed, the  bridge is the fourth longest bridge in Malaysia across a river, and also the third longest bridge in Borneo after Tayan Bridge in Tayan, Sanggau, West Kalimantan, Indonesia.

External links
Link between Sibu and Tanjung Manis to be ready by end of the month (Source: The Star, 4 June 2010)

Bridges in Sarawak